Bifunctional polynucleotide phosphatase/kinase is an enzyme that in humans is encoded by the PNKP gene. A detailed structural study of the crystallized mouse protein examined both the 5´-polynucleotide kinase and 3’-polynucleotide phosphatase activities. Additional features of the peptide sequence include a forkhead association (FHA) domain, ATP binding site and nuclear and mitochondrial localization sequences.

Interactions 

PNKP has been shown to interact with DNA polymerase beta and XRCC1.

Role in neurologic disease

The human gene encoding PNKP was observed to be mutated in patients with microcephaly, seizures and defects in DNA repair. A type of recessive ataxia is also associated with PNKP mutations. There are also newly characterized pathological variants of PNKP. Model organisms such as mice and Drosophila have been used to generate further insights.

References

Further reading